Ghostbusters is a 1984 film directed by Ivan Reitman.

Ghostbusters, Ghost Busters or Ghostbuster may also refer to:

Ghostbusters (franchise), the media franchise, of which the film Ghostbusters was the first installment
 Ghostbusters II, a 1989 live-action sequel to the original film
 Ghostbusters (2016 film), a 2016 reboot
 Ghostbusters: Afterlife, a 2021 sequel to the first two films
 The Real Ghostbusters, a 1980s animated series based on the film
 Extreme Ghostbusters, a 1997 animated sequel/spin-off to The Real Ghostbusters
 Ghostbusters (1984 soundtrack), the soundtrack for the first film
 "Ghostbusters" (song), the main theme for the films written by Ray Parker Jr.
 Ghostbusters II (soundtrack)
 Ghostbusters: Afterlife (soundtrack)
 Ghostbusters (role-playing game), a role-playing game
 Ghostbusters video games, which include:
 Ghostbusters (1984 video game), a 1984 game based on the first film
 Ghostbusters II (video game), a 1989 video game based on the second film
 Ghostbusters (1990 video game), a 1990 video game inspired by the first two films 
 The Real Ghostbusters (1993 video game), a 1993 video game based on the animated series
 Ghostbusters: The Video Game, a 2009 video game loosely based on the proposed Ghostbusters III script with a 2019 remastered release
 Ghostbusters: Sanctum of Slime, a 2011 video game sequel to Ghostbusters: The Video Game
 Ghostbusters (comics), various comic book series based on the property, which include:
 The Real Ghostbusters (comics), a comic adaption of the animated series by Marvel UK and NOW Comics
 Ghostbusters: Legion, a comic mini-series by 88 mph Comics
 The Ghost Busters, a 1970s live action TV series by Filmation
 Ghostbusters (1986 TV series), a 1980s cartoon sequel to the live action TV series
 Spook Busters, a 1946 Bowery Boys film the working title of which was Ghost Busters
 "Ghostbuster", the finishing move of professional wrestler Koko B. Ware
 Super Ghostbusters, a parody album made by the music artist Vargskelethor that consists of various midi versions of the Ghostbusters theme with increasingly more bizarre lyrics

See also
Ghosthunter (disambiguation)